Black Mountain Downtown Historic District is a national historic district located at Black Mountain, Buncombe County, North Carolina.  The district encompasses 56 contributing buildings and 1 contributing structure in the central business district of Black Mountain.  The district includes a variety of late-19th and early-20th century commercial and institutional buildings in the Commercial Style, American Craftsman, Classical Revival, Art Deco and Art Moderne.  Notable buildings include the George Stepp House (1907), Black Mountain Depot (1909), firehouse (1921) designed by Richard Sharp Smith, town hall (1927), Kaltman Building (1928), and Pure Oil Service Station (c. 1945).

It was listed on the National Register of Historic Places in 2004.

Gallery

References

Historic districts on the National Register of Historic Places in North Carolina
Neoclassical architecture in North Carolina
Art Deco architecture in North Carolina
Buildings and structures in Buncombe County, North Carolina
National Register of Historic Places in Buncombe County, North Carolina